Joyce Poon is Professor of Electrical and Computer Engineering at the University of Toronto and Director of the Max Planck Institute of Microstructure Physics, where her research focuses on developing new optical devices for applications in neurotechnology. She is also an honorary professor at the Technical University of Berlin. She is a Fellow of The Optical Society, and has been serving as a Director-At-Large for the society since January 2021.

Early life and education 
Poon was born in Hong Kong and grew up in Toronto. She obtained a B.A.Sc. in engineering from the University of Toronto in 2002 and an M.S. in Electrical engineering from California Institute of Technology in 2007. She stayed at Caltech to carry out her PhD under the supervision of Professor Amnon Yariv. Her thesis studied ways to control slow light in optical waveguides and was awarded the Milton and Francis Clauser Doctoral Prize. During her graduate studies, she founded Caltech's Student Chapter of The Optical Society.

Research and career 

In 2008, Poon moved back to the University of Toronto, where she is now Professor of Electrical and Computer Engineering. Her early postdoctoral research continued investigating waveguide resonators. While at Toronto, she built a research team focused on studying silicon-based integrated photonic technologies for applications in telecommunications. Her research group also focuses on neurotechnology, and investigate how integrated photonic devices can be to used to develop new brain imaging techniques.

Poon became an honorary professor at the Faculty of Electrical Engineering and Computer Science at the Technical University of Berlin in 2018. She is also principal investigator at the Neurotech Alliance and the Center for Advancing Neurotechnological Innovation to Application (CRANIA) at the University of Toronto.

Awards and honours 
Poon was elected as a Fellow of The Optical Society (OSA) in 2018 "for outstanding contributions to the research and development of silicon-based integrated optics, including microresonators, electro-optic modulators and integrated hybrid photonics". She will join the OSA board of directors in 2021 as Director-At-Large.

She was awarded the University of Toronto's McCharles' Prize for Early Career Distinction in 2013, and named one of the world's Top 35 IT innovators under 35 by the MIT Technology Review in 2012. Poon is a two-time recipient of the IBM Faculty Award (2010, 2011), and also received the Ontario Ministry of Research and Innovation Award (2009) and a University Faculty Award from the Natural Sciences and Engineering Research Council (2008).

References 

Living people
Women in optics
University of Toronto alumni
California Institute of Technology alumni
Academic staff of the University of Toronto
21st-century women scientists
21st-century women engineers
Fellows of Optica (society)
Year of birth missing (living people)
Max Planck Institute directors